Kim Seo-na (born 23 September 2000) is a field hockey player from South Korea.

Career

Under–21
In 2022, Kim Seo-na captained the South Korea U–21 team at the FIH Junior World Cup in Potchefstroom.

National team
Seo-na made her debut for the national team in 2019 during a test series against Chile in Seoul.

In 2022, she was a member of the silver medal-winning team at the Asian Cup in Muscat. Later that year she was a member of the team at the FIH World Cup in Amsterdam and Terrassa.

International goals

References

External links

2000 births
Living people
South Korean female field hockey players
Female field hockey forwards